This List of titles and honours of the Brazilian Crown sets out the titles of the monarchs of the Empire of Brazil while the monarchy was still in place.

The titles of Brazilian emperors during the Brazilian Empire

The full title

The short title

Titles held by the monarch of the Empire of Brazil

Empire 
  Emperor of Brazil

Titles held by the heir apparent of the Empire of Brazil

Principalities 
  Prince Imperial of Brazil
  Prince of Grão-Pará
  Prince of Brazil
  Prince of Saxe-Coburg and Gotha
  Prince of Orléans-Braganza

Duchies 
  Duke of Saxony

Counties 
  Count of Aquila
  Count of Eu

Hereditary Orders 
  Grand Cross of the Imperial Order of Christ
  Grand Cross of the Imperial Order of Aviz
  Grand Cross of the Imperial Order of the Cross
  Grand Cross of the Imperial Order of Saint James of the Sword
  Grand Cross of the Imperial Order of Pedro I
  Grand Cross of the Imperial Order of the Rose

Titles held by the heir apparent to the heir apparent of the Empire of Brazil

Principalities 
  Royal Prince of Two Sicilies
  Prince of Ligne
  Prince of Joinville

Duchies 
  Duke of Braganza

Counties 
  Count of Paris
  Count of Nicolaÿ

See also 
Brazilian nobility

Footnotes

References 

 
 
 

Brazilian monarchy
Brazilian monarchs
Princes of Brazil
Style of the Brazilian sovereign